A pai-de-santo is a male priest of Umbanda, Candomblé and Quimbanda, the Afro-Brazilian religions.  In Portuguese those words translate as "father of [the] saint[s]", which is an adaption from the Yoruba language word babalorishá, a title given to the African religion's priests. Babá means father, and the contraction l'Orishá means "of Orishá". As a product of the syncretism, the word Orishá (elevated or ancestral spirit) was adapted into Portuguese as saint. 

In the Afro-Brazilian religions the priests are the owners of the tradition, knowledge and culture and the ones responsible to pass it on to the new generations because there are no sacred written books.

See also
 Mãe-de-santo

Brazilian mythology
Religious syncretism in Brazil
Candomblé
Umbanda
Priests